Senator Fons may refer to:

Leonard Fons (1903–1956), Wisconsin State Senate
Louis Fons (1878–1959), Wisconsin State Senate